Yuri Ivanov (Bulgarian Cyrillic: Юри Иванов; born 5 July 1982) is a Bulgarian footballer who plays as a right defender for PFC Burgas.

Career
He had previously played for Vihren Sandanski, Lokomotiv Mezdra and Spartak Varna.

Awards
 Champion of B PFG 2013 (with Neftochimic Burgas)

References

External links

Bulgarian footballers
1982 births
Living people
First Professional Football League (Bulgaria) players
OFC Vihren Sandanski players
PFC Lokomotiv Mezdra players
PFC Spartak Varna players
PFC Minyor Pernik players
Neftochimic Burgas players
Association football defenders
People from Sandanski
Sportspeople from Blagoevgrad Province